Delturus carinotus is a species of armored catfish endemic to the Doce River basin in Brazil.

References

Loricariidae
Catfish of South America
Fish of the Doce River basin
Endemic fauna of Brazil
Taxa named by Francesca LaMonte 
Fish described in 1933